Alza.cz a.s. is an e-commerce store operating in the Czech Republic, Slovakia (Alza.sk), and since 2014, in other European Union countries (Alza.de, Alza.at, Alza.hu, Alza.co.uk, Alzashop.com). It's one of the largest online consumer electronics retailers in Central Europe with a strong stance in the toys, hobby, media and entertainment, perfume, watches and beauty segments too. It operates a chain of brick-and-mortar stores bearing the same name (Alza). The company was founded in 1994 under the name Alzasoft.

, the company had 53 stores and 1 800 AlzaBoxes, which are found throughout the Czech Republic, Slovakia, Hungary and Austria. Showrooms could be found in Prague, Bratislava and Budapest. The company Alza.cz was the largest online shop in the Czech Republic with an annual turnover of over €1,76 billion excluding VAT (45 billion CZK) in 2021. At the end of 2021, Alza.cz offered around 700,000 products and completed over 17,9 million purchase orders.

Alza.cz is owned by a group of investors that control it through the holding company L. S. Investments Limited, which is based in Cyprus. The shareholders are unknown. The Chief Executive Officer and Board of Directors is the company's founder Aleš Zavoral. Alza.cz acts as a Czech joint-stock company with a tax domicile in the Czech Republic.

History 

In 1994, the company founder Aleš Zavoral acquired his trade license for commercial activity. In the spring 1998, the company's first website was created, although it did not yet serve as an e-commerce site. In the summer of 1998, Alzasoft rented out a small store on Dělnická street in Prague, Czech Republic. In 2000, it moved to a bigger space on Jateční street in Prague. That's when its website also became an e-commerce store. In August 2002, the store and warehouses were flooded, but this did not jeopardise the company much.

The join-stock company Alzasoft a.s. emerged on 1 January 2004. It had 35 employees during that time. Alzasoft opened a branch in Slovakia (and gradually in Bratislava, Nitra, Trenčín and Trnava). The company warehouses located in the Prague Market in Holešovice were also expanded to a total of 1600m². In the year 2006, the company went through rebranding and was renamed Alza.cz. In 2008, the company created its own company mascot as the main face of most of its advertisements – Alza the Alien also known as Alzák, voiced by Bohdan Tůma.

In the summer of 2010, Alza opened a new logistics centre in Prague - Horní Počernice. In October 2015, Alza launched its Alza Premium club program. With an annual fee, Alza Premium members can receive free shipping, music, movies, special delivery services and an extended returns period.

In 2016, Alza.cz launched its online shop in Hungary, and it started to deliver purchase orders to customers even on Saturdays and Sundays. Alza also opened up its store hours during the weekend. In December 2016, Alza surpassed two of its records: it sold over one billion CZK in one week, and it hit a record of over 200 million CZK in purchase orders in one day.

In 2017, Alza.cz started selling electric cars, such as Tesla and other brands, and took part in cryptocurrency by giving the option to pay for purchases using Bitcoin. In regards to its European expansion, in the same year it opened its first store in Austria, a showroom in Hungary, and it rented out the new warehouse P3 Prague D8 in Zdiby. It also created a new B2C E-Commerce subject at the University of Economics, Prague.

2018 - Three innovative Alza Concept Stores are opened in Prague. A new showroom opens in Budapest. 1,800 new collection points across the Czech Republic and Slovakia. A new logistics centre is opened in Zdiby.

2019 - Partnered with the Liftago platform. New payment methods (ApplePay, GooglePay, in-app payments). A new segment (Alza Pet) and Aid Constellation, a unique charity platform, are launched.

2020 - A new logistics centre is opened in Senec. A massive expansion of the AlzaBox network and their opening to third parties. Launch of additional product segments on Alza.

2021 - Alza opened a new headquarters in Slovakia with a state-of-the-art Alza showroom. The logistics centre in Chrášťany near Prague and a local distribution centre in Budapest are now open. Launch of Alza Marketplace. Almost 1800 AlzaBoxes in service.

References 

Retail companies of the Czech Republic